Events from the year 1998 in Argentina

Incumbents
 President: Carlos Menem
 Vice president: Carlos Ruckauf

Governors
Governor of Buenos Aires Province: Eduardo Duhalde 
Governor of Catamarca Province: Arnoldo Castillo 
Governor of Chaco Province: Ángel Rozas 
Governor of Chubut Province: Carlos Maestro 
Governor of Córdoba: Ramón Mestre 
Governor of Corrientes Province: Pedro Braillard Poccard
Governor of Entre Ríos Province: Jorge Busti 
Governor of Formosa Province: Gildo Insfrán
Governor of Jujuy Province: Eduardo Fellner
Governor of La Pampa Province: Rubén Marín
Governor of La Rioja Province: Ángel Maza
Governor of Mendoza Province: Arturo Lafalla 
Governor of Misiones Province: Ramón Puerta 
Governor of Neuquén Province: Felipe Sapag
Governor of Río Negro Province: Pablo Verani
Governor of Salta Province: Juan Carlos Romero
Governor of San Juan Province: Jorge Escobar 
Governor of San Luis Province: Adolfo Rodríguez Saá
Governor of Santa Cruz Province: Néstor Kirchner
Governor of Santa Fe Province: Jorge Obeid 
Governor of Santiago del Estero: Carlos Juárez
Governor of Tierra del Fuego: José Arturo Estabillo
Governor of Tucumán: Antonio Domingo Bussi

Vice Governors
Vice Governor of Buenos Aires Province: Rafael Romá 
Vice Governor of Catamarca Province: Simón Hernández 
Vice Governor of Chaco Province: Miguel Pibernus 
Vice Governor of Corrientes Province: Victor Hugo Maidana
Vice Governor of Entre Rios Province: Héctor Alanis 
Vice Governor of Formosa Province: Floro Bogado
Vice Governor of Jujuy Province: vacant 
Vice Governor of La Pampa Province: Manuel Baladrón 
Vice Governor of La Rioja Province: Miguel Ángel Asís 
Vice Governor of Misiones Province: Julio Alberto Ifrán 
Vice Governor of Nenquen Province: Ricardo Corradi 
Vice Governor of Rio Negro Province: Bautista Mendioroz
Vice Governor of Salta Province: Walter Wayar
Vice Governor of San Juan Province: Rogelio Rafael Cerdera 
Vice Governor of San Luis Province: Mario Merlo
Vice Governor of Santa Cruz: Eduardo Arnold 
Vice Governor of Santa Fe Province: Gualberto Venesia 
Vice Governor of Santiago del Estero: Darío Moreno 
Vice Governor of Tierra del Fuego: Miguel Ángel Castro

Events
12 April - The 1998 Argentine Grand Prix is held at Autódromo Oscar Alfredo Gálvez in Buenos Aires, and is won by Michael Schumacher.
12 September - The Argentina national rugby union team plays the first match in its tour of Japan and Europe.

Deaths
3 May - René Mugica, actor, film director and screenwriter (born 1909)
17 October - Antonio Agri, violinist, composer and conductor (born 1932)

See also

List of Argentine films of 1998

References

 
Years of the 20th century in Argentina
Argentina
1990s in Argentina
Argentina